KPBS may refer to:

 KPBS Public Media, a not-for-profit organization licensed to San Diego, California, United States
 KPBS (TV), a television station (channel 19, virtual 15) licensed to San Diego, California, United States
 KPBS-FM, a radio station (89.5 FM) licensed to San Diego, California, United States
 Konza Prairie Biological Station, a tallgrass prairie research center co-owned by Kansas State University and the Nature Conservancy

See also 
 KBPS (disambiguation)